Xanterra Travel Collection (formerly Xanterra Parks & Resorts, Amfac Resorts and Amfac Parks & Resorts) is a privately owned American park and resort management company based in Greenwood Village, Colorado, controlled by entertainment magnate Philip Anschutz. Denver-based billionaire Anschutz, who has an extensive history of developing and operating mineral, railroad, newsmedia and entertainment enterprises, is one of the largest private promoters of live events in the world, most notably soccer.

Xanterra currently partners with the National Park Service to provide lodging and other tourism services inside National Parks.

History
A legacy of the 19th century Fred Harvey Company, after the death of the founder's grandson in 1965, the company became affiliated with Chicago-based JMB Realty, which acquired large Hawaii landholder Amfac in 1968 and broke it up into independent corporations including Amfac Resorts. In 1995, Amfac bought the large national parks management concession TW Recreational Services from Flagstar.  In 2002, Amfac changed its corporate name to Xanterra after the bankruptcy of Amfac Hawaii.  The name comes from a combination of Xanadu and terra (Earth). The Anschutz Company bought Xanterra from JMB in 2008.

Xanterra specializes in tourism in U.S. National Parks, and has a presence in Yellowstone and Grand Canyon, and a number of other national and state parks. They are contracted by the US National Park Service to provide lodging and services in these parks. Accommodations and pricing vary widely and include quality hotel rooms, lodges, rustic cabins, motel-style lodging and camping.

The most notable of the original Harvey operations is the Grand Canyon South Rim concession, including the El Tovar Hotel.

Glacier National Park controversy
In March 2013, Anshutz Exploration Corp. announced that it would cease drilling on the Blackfeet Reservation. Five months later, Xanterra was awarded an important concessions contract in Glacier National Park.

On August 13, 2013, the National Park Service announced that a 16-year contract would be issued to Xanterra despite the fact that the energy division had been fracking on lands adjacent to the eastern boundary of the park.  Members of the Blackfeet Nation had been protesting the destruction of tribal lands for several years.

Grand Canyon Railway 

Xanterra operates the Grand Canyon Railway in Arizona on the line originally built by the Atchison, Topeka and Santa Fe Railway. Since their takeover of the operation in 2007, the line has removed its historic steam locomotives and ALCO FA diesels from service in favor of their modern EMD F40FH diesels. Although, two of the FAs, #6793 and #6860, are still operational to pull the Williams Flyer train, and steam locomotives #29 and #4960, modified to run on waste vegetable oil, are also still used on special occasions.

References

External links 
 Xanterra website

Anschutz Corporation
Travel and holiday companies of the United States
Transport companies established in 1994
Companies based in Greenwood Village, Colorado
1994 establishments in Colorado
2008 mergers and acquisitions